The history of the game of Skat or Scat began in the early 19th century in Thuringia. The game spread rapidly within German-speaking Europe and also in the US and is now one of the most popular card games in Germany as well as being considered Germany's national card game.

History

Beginnings 
The early history of the game of Skat has not been fully researched. Many anecdotes about its origins cannot be proven and should be considered as legends. What is certain is that the game was developed between 1810 and 1817 in the Thuringian town of Altenburg from older card games. It was based on Dreiwendsch, which is a variant of the Wendish Schafkopf. The concept of bidding was adopted from L'Hombre and its simplified version, German Solo; the idea of setting aside two cards (the skat) was taken from Tarock. Doppelkopf, however, is not one of Skat's precursors but, like it, is a 20th century development of Schafkopf.

The first Skat players and "inventors" of the game were Altenburg dignitaries and members of a local Tarock club: grammar school teacher (Gymnasialprofessor), Johann Friedrich Ludwig Hempel (1773-1849), medical health officer (Medizinalrat), Dr. Hans Carl Leopold Schuderoff, court advocate and notary, Friedrich Ferdinand Hempel (1778-1836), Councillor Carl Christian Adam Neefe (1774-1821) and Chancellor Hans Carl Leopold von der Gabelentz (1778–1831). Another participant in the rounds was well-known publisher, Friedrich Arnold Brockhaus. The game was first known as Ore Mountain Schafkopf (Erzgebirgischer Schafkopf).

Von der Gabelentz's scores in these games have survived and can be seen in the Thuringian State Archive in Altenburg. In a notebook he listed his gaming losses and winnings in detail from 1798 to 1829, so that, even today, his gaming results are clear. On 4 September 1813 the term Scat appeared for the first time in this account. A further verifiable written record of the new game can be found in an article about Osterland games in edition no. 30 of the weekly Osterländische Blätter published in Altenburg on 25 July 1818 under the heading "Das Skadspiel".
In the years that followed the game spread more and more, especially among the students of Thuringian and Saxon universities and was soon popular in large parts of German-speaking Europe.

Although Johann Friedrich Ludwig Hempel published the first rule book for Skat, Das Scatspiel: Nebst zwei Liedern, in 1848, shortly before his death, more and more variations and regional peculiarities of the game developed.

Because of the poor economic conditions and lack of political freedom in many German states, Germany was a classic emigration region in the 19th century and many emigrants took the game with them to their new homeland.

First Skat congresses and foundation of German Skat Association 

The first 70 years were a success story. The game spread and won more and more supporters from all social classes, but suffered from a confusion of special regional rules. There was a danger that Skat would disintegrate into many new games.

In the 1870s important new movements began, which led to the rules being unified and later simplified. The founding of the Empire accelerated this process in many ways. During the boom of the Gründerzeit period, the game was able to spread throughout Germany unhindered by the old borders, but this also encouraged uncontrolled growth. In the rapidly expanding towns and the huge factories many people from different parts of the German Empire met and came into social contact. In addition, supra-regional player associations could be formed in the new unitary state, which ultimately led to the foundation of the German Skat Association.

In 1884, Freiherr von Hirschfeld published an Illustriertes Scatbuch (Illustrated Scat Book). One year later followed the set of rules, Illustriertes Lehrbuch des Scatspiels ("Illustrated Textbook of the Scat Game") by county court councillor, Karl Buhle. In 1886, on the occasion of an industrial fair in Altenburg, a big Skat tournament was held. The event led to the first Skat Congress. About a thousand participants decided the General German Rules of Skat (Allgemeine Deutsche Skatordnung), which was based on the aforementioned book by Buhle. At this time there were two fundamentally different playing methods. One variant was called Altenburg Suit Bidding (Altenburger Farbenreizen) and the other Leipzig Point Bidding (Leipziger Zahlenreizen). The participants of the first Skat Congress could not agree a compromise between the two varieties, which is why no association was founded. The second Skat Congress also failed due to this issue.

In 1887, the Skat Congress tried unsuccessfully to mandate German-suited cards for the game. But as Stein pointed out, there were vast areas of Germany that had largely gone over to French-suited cards.

On 12 March 1899, in Halle (Saale) at the Third Skat Congress, the German Skat Association was founded. Those present could still not agree on a final set of rules. Although suit bidding was declared an official form of the game, point bidding was still allowed. The Congress chose Altenburg as the headquarters of the new association.

A year earlier a comparable association had been founded in the United States: the North American Skat League. Skat had been played in the USA since at least 1876.

Up to the outbreak of the First World War, seven further Skat congresses followed, at which further rules, such as Null contracts, were defined. However, two points of contention could not be resolved: the method of bidding remained an acute issue which even a prize awarded in 1907 could not change. The second problem was that there was no agreement on a uniform Skat pack.

Introduction of modern standard Skat 
During the First World War, point bidding spread among the German soldiers. More and more variants developed. In the trenches men of different regional and social backgrounds met one another. If they wanted to play together, they had to find compromises between their domestic rules, which again led to new variations. In view of the situation that one would perhaps no longer be able to experience the settlement of the next round, the game increasingly took on the features of a game of chance with ever higher stakes.

Conservative skat players, who clung to the suit bidding, pejoratively referred to the point bidding game of the simple soldiers as Trench Skat.

Nevertheless, the codification of the basic rules for point bidding is thanks to a declared follower of the classic Altenburg suit bidding system. In 1924, the author of numerous Skat books and bookkeeper of the German Skat Association, Artur Schubert, published fixed rules for Gucki-Skat based on point bidding. In 1922, Schubert still rejected point bidding because the distribution of cards and the position of Jacks or Unters can already be guessed while bidding. He described the rules of the unpopular game variant in order to prevent further diversification.

In 1927 and 1928, after a break of 18 years, two Skat congresses were held in Altenburg. Apart from the details, the rule changes decided upon are the basis of today's game.
At the 11th Skat Congress, point bidding was agreed as the official and only playing method, settling a 40-year-old dispute. Another important decision was the establishment of a committee for disputes, from which the German Skat Court emerged. At the 12th Skat Congress the following year, the New German Skat Rules were passed. After the 12th Skat Congress, the basic rules of the game were only changed in detailed questions such as certain base values and scoring.

Not only did the First World War change the bidding system, but it also helped to establish Skat as Germany's pre-eminent card game. As Grünberg noted in north Germany in 1938 "before the war we mostly played Solo. Now everyone plays Skat. Only in the pub, when there is a lot of conversation is a social game of cards played, and that game is called 'Knüffelen'".

Recent history 

At the following two congresses, the values of the Null and normal Grand contracts, which are still valid today, were determined. It was also decided that Hand games would not be penalised twice and that the basic value of the Grand Ouvert would be 36. Another innovation was the regulation introduced in 1936 at the suggestion of Otto Seeger that every game won would be rewarded with a bonus of 50 points.

At the first Skat Congress after the Second World War, Altenburg-based President, Erich Fuchs, was confirmed in office. When he left East Germany in 1953, Bielefeld became the central seat of the German Skat Association. The following congresses brought further rule refinements like e.g. the expanded Seeger and Fabian scoring system.

Since there was also a desire in East Germany for a central authority to settle disputes, the Skataktiv was formed in Altenburg in 1963 to replace the Skat Court. The Altenburgers then adopted the western rule changes, so that despite the division of Germany there was a common rule basis in East and West.

In the early 1970s, the International Skat Players Association (ISPA) was founded, which interpreted some rules differently than the German Skat Association. The two competing associations could not reach a consensus. The conflict escalated when the German Skat Association banned its members from double membership in both associations in 1978. Since then, ISPA has mainly been responsible for the organisation of the annually alternating World and European Skat Championships, but its subdivision ISPA Germany and the DSkV organise their own German individual and team championships and leagues.

In 1980 the company Novag Industries launched Skat Champion, the world's first electronic Skat computer, on the German market. The device was strictly programmed according to the rules of the German Skat Association. However, Skat computers were not able to assert themselves permanently.

After German reunification in 1990, the East German clubs joined the German Skat Association again. The Skat Association tried to resolve the old dispute over playing cards with a compromise using a new French pack with German suits.

The conflict between the German Skat Association and ISPA was also resolved amicably in 1998. Both players' associations adopted the International Skat Regulations. Hand games have been penalised twice since then and the basic value of the Grand Ouvert has been set at 24. In addition, the players' associations formed the International Skat Court jointly in 2001, whose seat is in Altenburg.

In 2005, the office of the German Skat Association in Bielefeld was closed and moved to its historical headquarters in Altenburg in accordance with the resolutions of the 28th Skat Congress.

Overview of Skat congresses 
Between 1886 and 2006 there were 29 Skat Congresses. The German Skat Association was founded at the third Skat Congress. Important congresses are marked in bold:

Basic development of Skat rules

Early development 
In the first game variants, the dealer always received the two surplus cards and became a soloist. The trumps comprised the Unters (Jacks) and the trump suit as in the modern Suit contract. However, the declarer was not free to choose trumps. The trump suit, as in Wendish Schafkopf and most contracts of modern Doppelkopf, was permanently Bells (Diamonds). The soloist's only privilege was that he could discard two less useful cards. Otherwise, the dealer was forced to play and had no influence on the type of game. Under these rules, the soloist had to play even if he did not have a single trump or Ace in his hand. Of course, most solo games were lost.

In the next stage of development, the pack was cut and the bottom card determined the trump suit. So the dealer/soloist had at least one trump. To determine the trump suit, the lowest card had to be revealed, so that the other players knew at least one card held by the soloist.

Since this solution was not satisfactory either, and idea by Carl Christian Adam Neefe was adopted whereby an auction was held to determine the soloist and trump suit. By bidding, however, further types of contract other than the basic suit contracts became possible.

Early forms of Null and Grand were already being played in the 1840s. The Null was, from the outset, a plain-trick game and basically resembled its modern successor. The predecessor of Grand was called Ace Game (As-Spiel); it was the counterpart to Null and also had no trumps.

Suit bidding 
The main difference between Altenburg suit bidding (Altenburger Farbenreizen) and the point bidding system used today was that the suit bidding offered only the basic values of the games. Except in special cases, a player could not be overbid by an unfavourable Unter/Jack in the Skat, since the position of the Unters was not taken into account when bidding. "Matadors" (Spitzen) were not taken into account until after the game.

In addition, the game types differed from today's:

Point bidding 
Little is known about the early history and origins of point bidding. The first Skat Congress failed in its attempt to found an all-German Skat Association because its participants could not agree on a compromise between suit bidding and point bidding. This suggests that point bidding was already widespread in 1886. In the Skat Rules of the first Skat Congress under §26 point bidding is covered in  two sentences:

"By agreement or local use it may also be agreed that bidding from the Solo onwards (i.e. in the case of hand games) may be based, not the ranking of the contracts, but the number of points to be calculated each time for the individual contract (bidding based on Werth). Here, the regulations in §23, paragraphs 3 to 5 are to be applied analogously."'.[sic]

This rule explains today's suit values (9, 10, 11 and 12), because these were the basic values of Suit Solo games.

The next step was to extend point bidding to the other contracts. This meant inter alia that the Tourné contract no longer made any sense, because its game value was not predictable.

 Skat honoured in philately 
In 1967, East Germany issued a special series of postage stamps on the theme of German Playing Cards with pictures of the Jack/Unter of the German and Altenburg pattern pack. In 1986, the Deutsche Bundespost issued a special stamp on the occasion of the 100th anniversary of the first German Skat Congress. On 5 September 2013, Deutsche Post issued a special 90-cent stamp under the motto of 200 Jahre Skat ("200 years of Skat"). The design was by graphical artist, Christoph Niemann from Berlin.

 Footnotes 

 References 

 Literature 
 Grünberg, Peter (1938). "Knüffeln" in Die Heimat, Vol. 48, No. 1. Heimat und Erbe, Flensburg, pp. 27/28.

 External links 
Altenburg and the Card Game - The gaming passion of Altenburger townsfolk and farmers in the 19th century 
The History of Skat on the homepage of the German Skat Association
"Blick in die Geschichte des Skatspiels und des Deutschen Skatverbands" in Der Skatfreund'', May 1985, 30th annual edition. Deutscher Skatverband.
Die Geschichte des Skatspiels at www.mlac.ca.
Chronology of the History of the Game of Skat on the homepage of the German Skat Association
Infos/Historisches at www.skat-spielen.de.
Two Theories on the Early History of the Game of Skat
History of the Game of Skat at Skatfuchs.com
Extract from the Skat Rules of 1886
120 Years of Skat on WDR
 Ulli Kulke: In the world wars Skat was important to the war. www.welt.de, 8 June 2013 (retrieved 19 October 2015)
Picture of Johann Friedrich Ludwig Hempel

Skat (card game)
Skat